Watcom C/C++ (currently Open Watcom C/C++) is an integrated development environment (IDE) product from Watcom International Corporation for the C, C++, and Fortran programming languages.  Watcom C/C++ was a commercial product until it was discontinued, then released under the Sybase Open Watcom Public License as Open Watcom C/C++.  It features tools for developing and debugging code for DOS, OS/2, Windows, Linux operating systems, which are based upon x86, IA-32, x86-64 compatible processors.

History
Though no longer sold commercially by Sybase, the Watcom C/C++ compiler and the Watcom Fortran compiler have been made available free of charge as the Open Watcom package.

Stable version 1.9 was released in June 2010.

A forked version 2.0 beta was released that supports 64-bit hosts (Windows and Linux), built-in text editor, 2-phase build system, and the DOS version supports long filenames (LFN).

Release history
The Open Watcom Wiki has a comprehensive history.

License

The Open Source Initiative has approved the license as open source, but Debian, Fedora and the Free Software Foundation have rejected it because "It requires you to publish the source code publicly whenever you “Deploy” the covered software, and “Deploy” is defined to include many kinds of private use."

Design
The compiler can be operated from, and generate executable code for, the DOS, OS/2, Windows, Linux operating systems. It also supports NLM targets for Novell NetWare. There is ongoing work to extend the targeting to Linux and modern BSD (e.g., FreeBSD) operating systems, running on x86, PowerPC, and other processors.

The code is portable and, like many other open source compiler projects such as GCC or LCC the compiler backend (code generator) is retargetable.

Uses
In the mid-1990s some of the most technically ambitious DOS computer games such as Doom, Descent, Duke Nukem 3D, Rise of the Triad, and Tomb Raider were built using Watcom C/C++ using the DOS/4GW protected mode extender with the Watcom compiler.

It was used to port the game Retro City Rampage to DOS in 2015.

It is used by VirtualBox to compile the BIOS.

Current development for FreeDOS requires that all C source code must be compilable by Open Watcom C.

Open Watcom is the recommended compiler for application and driver development for the OS/2-based ArcaOS operating system.

Variants
There is an unofficial fork of Open Watcom V2 on GitHub. A variant of the 16bit DOS CRT library startup was created with WASM.

Compatibility
Open Watcom's syntax supports many conventions introduced by other compilers, such as Microsoft's and Borland's, including differing conventions regarding (for instance) the number of leading underscores on the "asm" tag. Code written specifically for another compiler rather than standard-compliant C or C++ will often compile with the Watcom compiler.

The compiler supports C89/C90 standards by default.

Open Watcom supports partial compatibility with the C99 standard. It implements the most commonly used parts of the standard. However, they are enabled only through the undocumented command-line switch "-za99". Three C99 features have been bundled as C90 Extension since pre-v1.0: C++ style comments (//), flexible array members, trailing comma allowed in enum declaration.

The compiler currently doesn't support any new major C11 features, though the C library does include "Safe C" functions. It is specified in ISO/IEC TR 24731-1 and known as "Bounds-checking interfaces (Annex K)" in C11. Some function name examples are strcpy_s(), memcpy_s(), printf_s().  This library was released along with Open Watcom 1.5 in April 2006.

See also
 Open Watcom Assembler

References

Further reading
 Watcom C/C++ Gets a New Face - review in October 1994 BYTE magazine
 The WATCOM C/C++ Programmer's FAQ

External links
 Sybase, Inc. pages: Watcom C/C++ version 11.0

Open Watcom
 , official website, 
 
 Open Watcom V1.9 & V2 Fork - installer downloads on SourceForge

C (programming language) compilers
C++ compilers
Formerly proprietary software
2003 software